KQCF may refer to:

 KQCF (FM), a radio station (88.1 FM) licensed to serve Chiloquin, Oregon, United States
 Korea Queer Culture Festival